Louise Duprey (1957 – February 2000) was a British character actress, best known for her 1993 stint as shop girl Amy Nelson in ITV1's soap opera, Coronation Street.

Duprey had been set for a long run in the serial with her character being due to marry on-screen love interest, Andy McDonald. However, in late 1993, just as the wedding scenes were about to be recorded, Duprey suffered a breakdown and was sent home on leave. After it became apparent that she would not be well enough to return to the programme, a storywriters' conference was quickly convened and scripts redrafted. In the programme, viewers saw the engagement between the characters of Andy McDonald and Amy Nelson being hurriedly 'broken off' with another actress, Melanie Brown, being used in the final scenes to play the part of Nelson. Thereafter, Duprey withdrew from the limelight altogether, moving back to her native Liverpool, and became increasingly reclusive. In February 2000 she was found dead in a converted 1930s detached house in Mossley Hill near Liverpool University from a drug overdose. She left one daughter, Marcelle (b. 1976).

References

External links

1957 births
2000 deaths
English soap opera actresses
20th-century English actresses